Nowtarki-ye Gharibi (also Romanized as Nowtarkī-ye Gharībī; also known as Nowtargī-ye Gharībī) is a village in Howmeh-ye Gharbi Rural District, in the Central District of Izeh County, Khuzestan Province, Iran. At the 2006 census, its population was 269, in 53 families.

References 

Populated places in Izeh County